Akim Dmitriyevich Samar (1916–1943) was a Soviet poet and novelist regarded as the first Nanai-language writer.

Born in the Russian Far East in 1916, Samar was a student at Institute of the Peoples of the North in Leningrad and joined the Red Army after Nazi Germany invaded the Soviet Union. He died at the Battle of Stalingrad in 1943. His works included the poetry collections Songs of the Nanai (1938) and Poems (1940) and the 1941 novel A Poor Man's Son.

External links
 Akim Dmitriyevich Samar in the Great Soviet Encyclopedia 

1916 births
1943 deaths
People from Solnechny District
People from Primorskaya Oblast
Soviet novelists
Soviet male writers
20th-century male writers
Soviet poets
Male poets
Soviet military personnel killed in World War II
Tungusic peoples